Antonio de Miguel Postigo (1896 – 24 November 1936) was a Spanish footballer who played as a forward for Real Madrid and Atlético Madrid.

Club career
Born in Madrid, he began his career in 1916 at his hometown club Madrid FC, with whom he played for 8 seasons, in which the highlight of his career was winning the 1917 Copa del Rey Final against Arenas de Getxo. He remained loyal to the club for 8 years until 1924, when the club's board of directors decided that the low form of an aging de Miguel did not allow him to continue defending the colours of Madrid, and thus, he ended up in the neighboring club, Atlético Madrid.

In his first season at Atlético, he contributed decisively in helping them win the 1924–25 Centro Championship four points clear of Madrid FC, thus proving he was not too old after all, and unlike what Real might have thought, de Miguel played a further five seasons with Athletic before retiring in 1929, being also pivotal in helping the club reach the 1926 Copa del Rey Final which they lost 2–3.

International career
Like many other FC Madrid players of that time, he played several matches for the Madrid national team during the 1910s and 1920s, however, due to the little statistical rigor that the newspapers had at that time, the exact amount of caps he earned is unknown. He was part of the Madrid side that participated in the second edition of the Prince of Asturias Cup in 1916, an inter-regional competition organized by the RFEF. The following edition of the tournament coincided with the 1917 Copa del Rey Final between Madrid FC and Arenas, which prevented the Madrid national side from using the Madrid FC players, and thus, they had to call the "second options", of which his brother Pablo De Miguel, was a part of, and despite being a weaker side, they won the tournament for the first time in Madrid's history. De Miguel was then a member of the team that won the 1918 edition, starting in both games against Cantabric as Madrid won their second title in a row.

De Miguel also represented Centro in both the 1922–23 and 1923–24 tournaments, and on the latter he scored the only goal in the quarter-finals against Galicia, and he started in the infamous final against Catalonia which ended in a 4–4 draw, but did not play in the replay two days later, and without him the Centro team was beaten 2–3.

Honours

Club
Madrid FC
Centro Championship:
Winners (6): 1916–17, 1917–18, 1919–20, 1921–22, 1922–23 and 1923–24

Copa del Rey:
Winners (1): 1917

Athletic Madrid
Centro Championship:
Winners (1): 1924–25

Copa del Rey:
Runner-up (1): 1926

International
Madrid
Prince of Asturias Cup:
Champions (1): 1918
Runner-up (2): 1916 and 1923–24

References

1896 births
1936 deaths
Footballers from Madrid
Spanish footballers
Association football forwards
Real Madrid CF players
Atlético Madrid footballers